Nikolaos Sifounakis (born 21 December 1949 in Rethymno) is a Greek politician, former Minister for the Aegean and ex-member of the European Parliament (MEP). He was elected on the Panhellenic Socialist Movement ticket and sat with the Party of European Socialists group. On 23 July 2004 he was elected Chair of the Committee on Culture and Education.

In the 2007 Greek legislative election he was elected to the Greek Parliament for Lesbos, and consequently resigned from the European Parliament.

External links
Personal Website
 

1949 births
Living people
PASOK politicians
Politicians from Crete
Greek MPs 2007–2009
Greek MPs 2009–2012
PASOK MEPs
MEPs for Greece 2004–2009
Greek MPs 2012–2014
People from Rethymno